Léo Mineiro (born 10 March 1990) is a Brazilian footballer who plays for Fagiano Okayama.

Club team career statistics
Updated as of 5 December 2017.

References

External links

1990 births
Living people
Footballers from Belo Horizonte
Brazilian footballers
Association football forwards
J2 League players
FC Gifu players
Jeju United FC players
Daegu FC players
Busan IPark players
Al-Markhiya SC players
Avispa Fukuoka players
Fagiano Okayama players
K League 1 players
K League 2 players
Qatar Stars League players
Brazilian expatriate footballers
Brazilian expatriate sportspeople in Japan
Expatriate footballers in Japan
Brazilian expatriate sportspeople in South Korea
Expatriate footballers in South Korea
Expatriate footballers in Qatar
Brazilian expatriate sportspeople in Qatar